Plymouth Harbor is a harbor located in Plymouth, a town in the South Shore region of the U.S. state of Massachusetts. It is part of the larger Plymouth Bay. Historically, Plymouth Harbor was the site of anchorage of the Mayflower where the Plymouth Colony pilgrims disembarked in 1620 to establish a permanent settlement at Plymouth.

Gallery

See also
Plymouth Sound

References

External links

 Map of Plymouth Bay and related bodies of water

Plymouth, Massachusetts
Ports and harbors of Massachusetts
Transportation in Plymouth County, Massachusetts